Oak Run (also Oakrun) is a small unincorporated community  east of Redding in Shasta County, California, United States. Its population is 158 as of the 2020 census. It has a store and a post office run by a family who lives in the town-famous "Oak Run House", just behind the store and post office. It also has a school, library, a volunteer fire department and 765 people. The ZIP Code is 96069. The community is inside area code 530. It was the site of a massacre of 300 Yana Indians in 1864

Politics
In the state legislature Oak Run is in the 1st State Senate District, represented by Republican Brian Dahle, and in the 1st State Assembly District, represented by Republican Megan Dahle.

Economy
Oak Run is home to the Phillips Brothers Mill, the last fully steam-powered sawmill in the United States, which is listed on the National Register of Historic Places.

Climate
This region experiences warm, and occasionally hot, dry summers, with the average monthly temperatures in the summer months of July, August, and September averaging, respectively, 93, 93, and 89 °F.  Two month, January and February, experience freezing weather, with 12 inches of annual snowfall.  The area receives an average of 63 inches of rain annually, concentrated during the months of November through March.
According to the Köppen Climate Classification system, Oak Run has a warm-summer Mediterranean climate, abbreviated "Csb" on climate maps.

References

Unincorporated communities in California
Unincorporated communities in Shasta County, California